The St George's Hill Open tournament was founded as the St George's Hill Tournament a men's grass court tennis tournament staged at St Georges Hill Weybridge, Surrey, England in 1881, that ran until 1883, and was not held again. In 1913 the St Georges Hill Lawn Tennis Club was established. In 1922 St Georges Hill LTC started a combined men's and women's tournament the St George's Hill Open this ran as a senior tennis tour event until 1966.

History
The St George's Hill Tournament a men's grass court tennis tournament first staged in 1881 at the Weybridge, Surrey, England. The first winner of the men's singles was England's Algernon Wilfred Milne. In 1913 the St George's Hill Lawn Tennis Club opened. In 1922 a new combined event was established called the St George's Hill Open Tournament this time the grass court tournament ran until 1966.

Though the tournament is no longer a part of any international tour, it is still being staged today and is known as the St George's Hill Open Tennis Tournament.

Finals

Men's Singles
Incomplete roll

Women's Singles
Incomplete roll

References

Sources
 1877 to 2012 Finals Results. stevegtennis.com. Steve G Tennis. 
 American Lawn Tennis. (1937) New York: American Lawn Tennis Publishing Company.
 Keesing's Contemporary Archives (1935). Amsterdam: Keesing's Limited. 
 Nieuwland, Alex (2011–2022). Tournament:St. Georges Hill. Tennis Archives. Netherlands.
 Pathfinder. (1935). Philadelphia, PA, United States: Farm Journal, Incorporated.
 Routledges Sporting Annual. (1883). George Routledge and Sons. London. England.
 St. George's Hill Open Tennis Tournament (Surrey). www.tennisuk.net. Tennis Services UK Limited.
 The Oxnard Daily Courier (1938). Oxnard, California, United States.

Defunct tennis tournaments in the United Kingdom
Grass court tennis tournaments